The World Brass Knuckles Championship was a professional wrestling brass knuckles championship in the Australian World Championship Wrestling promotion from 1974 until 1978.

Title history

See also

Professional wrestling in Australia
World Championship Wrestling

References

External links

Hardcore wrestling championships
World Championship Wrestling (Australia) championships
Professional wrestling in Australia
World professional wrestling championships